Keterisi Mineral Vaucluse Natural Monument is a cluster of powerful mineral water artesian aquifers pouring out at the foot of the Greater Caucasus, known as Narzan vaucluse. These mineral springs provide 25-30 million liters of hydrocarbonate-calcium water, which corresponds to 300-350 liters per second. From these sources originates stream, which creates water cascades in the village of Keterisi.

It is part of Kazbegi Protected Areas along with Kazbegi National Park and five Natural Monuments:
Sakhizari Cliff,
Abano Mineral Lake,
Truso Travertine,
Jvari Pass Travertine,
Keterisi Mineral Vaucluse.

References

Natural monuments of Georgia (country)
Geography of Mtskheta-Mtianeti